The Tooth Fairy is a fantasy figure of early childhood in Western and Western-influenced cultures. The folklore states that when children lose one of their baby teeth, they should place it underneath their pillow or on their bedside table and the Tooth Fairy will visit while they sleep, replacing the lost tooth with a small payment.

Origins
In Northern Europe, there was a tradition of tand-fé or tooth fee, which was paid when a child lost their first tooth. This tradition is recorded in writings as early as the Eddas (c. 1200), which are the earliest written record of Norse and Northern European traditions. In the Norse culture, children's teeth and other articles belonging to children were said to bring good luck in battle, and Scandinavian warriors hung children's teeth on a string around their necks.

During the Middle Ages, other superstitions arose surrounding children's teeth. In England, for example, children were instructed to burn their baby teeth to save the child from hardship in the afterlife. Children who did not consign their baby teeth to the fire would spend eternity searching for them in the afterlife. The Vikings paid children for their teeth. Fear of witches was another reason to bury or burn teeth. In medieval Europe, it was thought that if a witch were to get hold of one's teeth, it could lead to total power over them.

Another modern incarnation of these traditions into an actual Tooth Fairy has been traced to a 1908 "Household Hints" item in the Chicago Daily Tribune:

Appearance
Unlike Father Christmas and, to a lesser extent, the Easter Bunny, there are few details of the Tooth Fairy's appearance that are consistent in various versions of the myth. A 1984 study conducted by Rosemary Wells revealed that most, 74 percent of those surveyed, believed the Tooth Fairy to be female, while 12 percent believed the Tooth Fairy to be neither male nor female and 8 percent believed the Tooth Fairy could be either male or female. When asked about her findings regarding the Tooth Fairy's appearance, Wells explained: "You've got your basic Tinkerbell-type Tooth Fairy with the wings, wand, a little older and whatnot. Then you have some people who think of the tooth fairy as a man, a bunny rabbit, or a mouse." One review of published children's books and popular artwork found the Tooth Fairy also to be depicted as a child with wings, a pixie, a dragon, a blue mother-figure, a flying ballerina, two little older men, a dental hygienist, a potbellied flying man smoking a cigar, a bat, a bear, and others. Unlike the well-established imagining of Santa Claus, differences in renderings of the Tooth Fairy are not as upsetting to children.

Depiction on coins and currency
Starting in 2011, the Royal Canadian Mint began selling special sets for newborn babies, birthdays, wedding anniversaries, "Oh Canada" and the Tooth Fairy. The Tooth Fairy quarters, which were issued only in 2011 and 2012, were packaged separately.

In 2020, the Royal Australian Mint began issuing "Tooth Fairy kits" that included commemorative $2 coins.

Reward 
The reward left varies by country, the family's economic status, amounts the child's peers report receiving, and other factors. A 2013 survey by Visa Inc. found that American children receive $3.70 per tooth on average. According to the same survey, only 3% of children find a dollar or less and 8% find a five-dollar bill or more under their pillow.

The reward is affected by inflation. According to data gathered by the American dental insurance company Delta Dental, the average payout per tooth in the United States rose from $1.30 in 1998 to $6.23 in 2023. According to Delta Dental, the payout's trends typically mirror larger economic conditions and the S&P 500 stock index.

Delta Dental found that in the United States, the first tooth lost gets a higher reward than other teeth on average.

Belief

Belief in the Tooth Fairy is viewed in two very different ways. On the one hand, children believing is seen as part of the trusting nature of childhood. Conversely, belief in the Tooth Fairy is frequently used to label adults as being too trusting and ready to believe anything.

Parents tend to view the myth as providing comfort for children in the loss of their tooth. Research finds that belief in the Tooth Fairy may provide such comfort to a child experiencing fear or pain resulting from the loss of a tooth. Mothers especially seem to value a child's belief as a sign that their "baby" is still a child and is not "growing up too soon". By encouraging belief in a fictional character, parents allow themselves to be comforted that their child still believes in fantasy and is not yet "grown up".

Children often discover the Tooth Fairy is imaginary as part of the 5- to 7-year shift, often connecting this to other gift-bearing imaginary figures (such as Santa Claus and the Easter Bunny).

Author Vicki Lansky advises parents to tell their children early that the tooth fairy pays a whole lot more for a perfect tooth than for a decayed one. According to Lansky, some families leave a note with the payment, praising the child for good dental habits.

Research findings suggest a possible relationship between a child's continued belief in the Tooth Fairy (and other fictional characters) and false memory syndrome.

Related myths

El Ratoncito Pérez or Ratón Pérez ( Perez the Little Mouse or Perez Mouse) is the Spanish and Hispanic American equivalent to the Tooth Fairy. He first appeared in a 1894 tale written by Luis Coloma for King Alfonso XIII, who had just lost a milk tooth at the age of eight. As is traditional in other cultures, when a child loses a tooth it is customary for the child to place it under the pillow, so that El Ratoncito Pérez will exchange it for a small payment or gift. The tradition is almost universal in Spanish cultures, with some slight differences. He is generally known as "El Ratoncito Pérez", with the exception of some regions of Mexico, Peru and Chile, where he is called "El Ratón de los Dientes" ( The Tooth Mouse), and in Argentina, Venezuela, Uruguay and Colombia, where he is known simply as "El Ratón Pérez". He was used by Colgate marketing in Venezuela and Spain.

In Italy, the Tooth Fairy (Fatina dei denti) is also often replaced by a small mouse, named Topolino. In some areas the same role is held by Saint Apollonia, known as Santa Polonia in Veneto. (Saint Apollonia's legendary martyrdom involved having her teeth broken; she is frequently depicted artistically holding a tooth and is considered the patron saint of dentistry and those with toothache and dental problems.)

In France and French-speaking Belgium, this character is called La Petite Souris (The Little Mouse). From parts of Lowland Scotland comes a tradition similar to the fairy mouse: a white fairy rat who purchases children's teeth with coins.

In Catalonia, the most popular would be Els Angelets (little angels) and also "Les animetes" (little souls) and as in the other countries, the tooth is placed under the pillow in exchange of a coin or a little token.

In the Basque Country, and specially in Biscay, there is Mari Teilatukoa (Mary from the roof), who lives in the roof of the baserri and catches the teeth thrown by the children.

In Japan, a different variation calls for lost upper teeth to be thrown straight down to the ground and lower teeth straight up into the air; the idea is that incoming teeth will grow in straight.

In Korea, a common practice was to throw both upper and lower teeth on the roof. The practice is rooted around the Korean national bird, the magpie. It is said that if the magpie finds a tooth on the roof, it will bring good luck. Some scholars think the myth derived from the word 까치(Ka-chi) which was a middle Korean word for magpies that sounds similar to "new teeth", or because of the significance of magpies in Korean mythology as a messenger between gods and humans.

In Middle Eastern countries (including Iraq, Jordan, Egypt and Sudan), there is a tradition of throwing a baby tooth up into the sky to the sun or to Allah. This tradition may originate in a pre-Islamic offering, and dates back to at least the 13th century. It is also mentioned by Izz bin Hibat Allah Al Hadid in the 13th century.

In Mali, children throw baby teeth into the chicken coop in order to receive a chicken the following day.

In popular culture

Tales of the Tooth Fairies is a British children's television programme first aired 1993.

In the 2010 film Tooth Fairy, Dwayne Johnson plays as the titular character. The 2012 sequel stars Larry the Cable Guy.

A 2006 horror film, The Tooth Fairy, features an evil Tooth Fairy.

A killer nicknamed "The Tooth Fairy" (because of his habit of leaving bite marks on his victims) is featured in "Red Dragon", part of the Hannibal Lecter franchise by Thomas Harris. He appears in the 1981 novel and the 1986 and 2002 film adaptations.

William Joyce's book series The Guardians of Childhood features Toothiana, a half-human tooth fairy resembling a Kinnari operating out of South Asia. She and a vast legion of mini fairies (depicted in the books as being an ability to split herself into smaller copies, while the film has them as separate entities) collect children's teeth to safeguard the childhood memories held within, with the film also including a brief appearance by the Tooth Mouse. In its 2012 film adaptation Rise of the Guardians, she is voiced by Isla Fisher.

In episode 2 of The Irregulars, a 2021 series on Netflix, the myth of the tooth fairy is an integral part of the plot.

In The Legend of Toof, by P.S. Featherston, a story originally told in 2006 and published in 2021 by TF Press, we learn of the dangerous adventures of a small woodland sprite named Toof. Toof is the original tooth fairy born with the ability to know when a child has lost a tooth and how to find him/her. The story identifies why fairies need a child's tooth, how it keeps them safe from gremlins and why it is important for children to help them in this endeavor. In The Legend of Toof we meet all of the original Tooth Fairies, two human children that help him defeat hidden world's most despicable villains: Colsore, Deekay and Plaak, their army of Drolls, and the original Tooth Mouse of Spain, Ratoncito Pérez and learn his story. Because of Toof, we discover how fairies can fly at the speed of light, the importance of their friendship with children, where they get the special coins they leave as gifts, and much more as it relates to Tooth Fairy lore.

See also
Don't Be Afraid of the Dark – A film featuring an early version of the creatures
 Fairy
 Ratoncito Pérez – Spanish tooth mouse
 Hammaspeikko – Finnish tooth troll
 Hogfather – Discworld novel featuring their version of the Tooth Fairy

References

Further reading
 Lainez, Rene Colato (2010). The Tooth Fairy Meets El Raton Perez. Illustrated by Tom Lintern. .
 Narváez, Peter (1997) The Good People: New Fairylore Essays (section V). University Press of Kentucky.
 Wynbrandt, James (1998). The Excruciating History of Dentistry. St. Martin's Press. .

External links

 
Childhood
European folklore characters
Traditions